Höfðatorg Tower 1 is an office tower in Iceland. The building is located close to downtown Reykjavík. It is 74 metres (243 ft) high and has a total of 19 floors, from the ground up. The tower's construction was completed in 2009. It is a part of a complex called Höfðatorg.

The name Höfðatorg is taken from the house Höfði, which is very close to the building.

See also 
 List of tallest buildings in Iceland

References 

Towers in Iceland
Buildings and structures in Reykjavík

Office buildings completed in 2009